The Gotham Independent Film Award for Outstanding Supporting Performance is one of the annual Gotham Independent Film Awards and was first awarded in 2021. 

It is a gender neutral award and was introduced for the Gotham Independent Film Awards 2021 to replace the awards for Best Actor and Best Actress given out in previous years.

Winners and nominees

2020s

See also
 Independent Spirit Award for Best Supporting Male
 Independent Spirit Award for Best Supporting Female

References

Outstanding Supporting Performance
Film awards for supporting actor
Film awards for supporting actress
Awards established in 2021